Lisa Loraine Baker (born 26 August 1958) is an Australian politician who has been a Labor Party member of the Legislative Assembly of Western Australia since 2008, representing the seat of Maylands.

Baker was born in Perth. She attended Perth College, Mercedes College, and Governor Stirling Senior High School at various points, and then went on to the Western Australian Institute of Technology (now Curtin University), graduating with an initial degree in psychology and then a graduate diploma in development studies. During the 1990s, Baker was employed by the National Native Title Tribunal as director of its business services division. In 2002, she became the CEO of the Western Australian Council of Social Service (WACOSS), a peak organisation for the social services sector in Western Australia.

From 1998 to 2001, Baker also served on the Mundaring Shire Council. In 2008, she was preselected as the Labor candidate for Maylands, a safe seat. She subsequently entered parliament at the 2008 state election, replacing the retiring Judy Edwards. Her majority was reduced at the 2013 election (as part of a statewide swing against Labor), turning Maylands into a marginal seat. Baker is openly gay, and owns a 20-acre property on the outskirts of Perth.

Baker was appointed Deputy Speaker of the Legislative Assembly on 11 May 2017.

References

1958 births
Living people
Australian Labor Party members of the Parliament of Western Australia
Lesbian politicians
LGBT legislators in Australia
Members of the Western Australian Legislative Assembly
People educated at Governor Stirling Senior High School
People educated at Perth College (Western Australia)
Western Australian local councillors
Curtin University alumni
21st-century Australian politicians
21st-century Australian women politicians
Women members of the Western Australian Legislative Assembly
Women local councillors in Australia